Buttington railway station was a station in Buttington, Powys, Wales. The station was opened in November 1860, several months after the line that served it (the Oswestry and Newtown Railway).  A second line  - the jointly operated Shrewsbury and Welshpool Railway reached the station in January 1862.  It was substantially rebuilt (with additional platforms) in 1893 by the Cambrian Railway, when the route west to Welshpool was doubled.

It was closed to both passenger and goods traffic on 12 September 1960, along with all the other intermediate stations on the Shrewsbury to Welshpool section.  The former O&NR route to Oswestry and Whitchurch subsequently closed in January 1965, leaving just the Shrewsbury to Welshpool line in operation - this is still open today, though no trace of the station itself remains.

References

Further reading

Disused railway stations in Powys
Railway stations in Great Britain opened in 1860
Railway stations in Great Britain closed in 1960
Former Cambrian Railway stations